Rodolfo Llopis Ferrándiz (27 February 1895, Callosa d'En Sarrià, Alicante, Spain – 22 July 1983, Albi, France) was a Spanish socialist politician.  He was the General Secretary of the  Spanish Socialist Workers' Party in exile from  1944 to 1972.

In 1947 he succeeded José Giral as prime minister of the Spanish Republican government in exile.  Álvaro de Albornoz y Liminiana succeeded him the same year.

During the period of the Spanish Second Republic, Llopis was heavily involved with primary education reforms. His achievements in this role were great and this, combined with his dapper appearance and youth, earned him the title of "the Rudolph Valentino of pedagogy."

References

1895 births
1983 deaths
People from Marina Baixa
Spanish Socialist Workers' Party politicians
Members of the Congress of Deputies of the Second Spanish Republic
Politicians from the Valencian Community
Unión General de Trabajadores members
Spanish people of the Spanish Civil War (Republican faction)
Exiles of the Spanish Civil War in France